Ogan Komering Ulu Regency is a regency of South Sumatra, Indonesia. It formerly covered an area of 10,408 km2 with a population of around 1,000,000 people; however by 2010 parts of this area had been split off to form separate regencies of East Ogan Komering Ulu and South Ogan Komering Ulu; the residual regency area covers just 4,797.06 km2 and had a population of 324,045 at the 2010 Census and 367,603 at the 2020 Census. The administrative centre is the town of Baturaja.

Administrative districts 

This Regency is administratively composed of thirteen districts (kecamatan), listed below with their areas (in km2) and their 2010 and 2020 Census populations. The table also includes the locations of the district administrative centres, the numbers of villages (rural desa and urban kelurahan) in each district, and its postal code.

Note: (a) The 2010 population of the new Kedaton Peninjauan Raya District, created since 2010, is included in the figure for Peninjauan District, from which it was removed.

Harimau Cave and Putri Cave
Both caves lay in the same Padangbindu village 35 kilometers from Baturaja. Harimau (Tiger) Cave entrance is 40 to 50 meters wide and 20 to 35 meters height. Since 2008 to mid-2013 archaeologists have found 72 skeletons of mongoloid race with prediction 3,000 years of age and the excavation is still running. Some of the skeletons are displayed in Si Pahit Lidah (Bitter Tongue) Museum near Putri (Princess) Cave. Putri Cave has 20x160 meter square pond.

Harimau Cave is located 30 meters above Air Kaman Basa River and 1.5 kilometers from Ogan River. Archeologists predicted that the cave has been used since 15 centuries ago and at least there are 3 different cultures have founded with the last culture is 3,500 years ago (Bronze Age) with metal apparatus similar with has been found in Dong son sites, Vietnam. There are also 34 geometric pictures in Harimau Cave which the picture is never found at any other caves in Sumatra. On March 14, 2015 after midnight, a big flood which never occurred before appeared ruins tourist facilities inside the cave and also the facilities in the ground in front of the cave; tourism facilities are predicted 70 percent damaged, but the condition of the pictures are not yet announced.

References

Regencies of South Sumatra